In solid-state physics and crystallography, a crystal structure is described by a unit cell. There are an infinite number of unit cells with different shapes and sizes which can describe the same crystal. Say that a crystal structure is described by a unit cell U. The supercell S of unit cell U is a cell which describes the same crystal, but has larger volume than cell U. Many methods which use a supercell perturbate it somehow to determine properties which cannot be determined by the initial cell. For example, during phonon calculations by the small displacement method, phonon frequencies in crystals are calculated using force values on slightly displaced atoms in the supercell. Another very important example of a supercell is the conventional cell of body-centered (bcc) or face-centered (fcc) cubic crystals.

Unit cell transformation

The basis vectors of unit cell U  can be transformed to basis vectors of supercell S  by linear transformation

where  is a transformation matrix. For example, the matrix

transforms a primitive cell to body-centered. Another particular case of the transformation is a diagonal matrix (i.e.). This called diagonal supercell expansion and can be represented as repeating of the initial cell over crystallographic axes of the initial cell.

Application

Supercells are also commonly used in computational models of crystal defects to allow the use of periodic boundary conditions.

See also
 Crystal structure
 Bravais lattice
 Primitive cell
 Space group

References

External links
 IUCR online dictionary of crystallography

Crystallography